Kolky is a village in Sarny Raion, Rivne Oblast, Ukraine, but was formerly administered within Dubrovytsia Raion. As of the year 2001, the community had 1913 residents. The village's postal code is 34144, and the KOATUU code is 5621883401.

References 

Populated places established in 1576

Villages in Sarny Raion